The National Parliamentary Debate Association (NPDA) is one of the two national intercollegiate parliamentary debate organizations in the United States. The other is the American Parliamentary Debate Association. Its membership is national with participating schools throughout the country. In 2015, NAPA was the largest debating organization in the United States with around 200-250 participating schools in any given year.

The Rules of NPDA Debate
In tournaments sponsored or sanctioned by the NPDA, teams of two debate head-to-head. Tournaments issue a new topic each round, generally on issues such as politics, philosophy and current affairs. After the announcement of the topic, the two teams have a limited preparation time, which is 15 minutes plus the time it takes to walk to the furthest away round in which debates will be taking place (usually rounded to 20 minutes), during which to write out their respective cases.

The standard time limits for an NPDA debate are:
 First Proposition Speaker: 7 minutes
 First Opposition Speaker: 8 minutes
 Second Proposition Speaker: 8 minutes
 Second Opposition Speaker: 8 minutes
 Opposition Rebuttal: 4 minutes
 Proposition Rebuttal: 5 minutes

There are tournaments, however, at which these are modified, generally to a 7-7-7-7-5-5 format. The Claremont Colleges tournament, for instance, uses this 7-5 format. During constructive speeches, debaters may introduce new arguments and the speaker's opponents may rise to ask questions of the speaker. Constructive speakers can accept or reject any given question. Rebuttals are exclusively for summarizing the arguments that were made during constructives.

Over the past few years, many coaches and competitors have referred to the official title of speeches with different names.  These are unofficial yet very popular with many judges: 
 Prime Minister Constructive
 Leader of Opposition Constructive
 Member of Government Constructive
 Member of Opposition Constructive
 Leader of Opposition Rebuttal
 Prime Minister Rebuttal

There is a ban on quoted evidence. This simply means that the debaters may not bring in printed, published evidence and consult it during the round. It is expected that debaters will use their own pre-existing knowledge and research conducted prior to the start of the actual round to back their arguments with reasoning and empirical data. This places parli in stark contrast to the other common intercollegiate debate format, policy debate, where debaters may utilize quoted evidence.

Any mature debate circuit will develop its own customs and practices. Some people argue that the NPDA rules are very laissez-faire, preferring to let the norms of what constitutes valid argumentation be subjects for the debate itself. Others believe that, in recent years, the NPDA has been hesitant to allow its participants to engage in controversial, avant garde or "non-traditional" debate practices at its national championship tournament.

The NPDA Championship Tournament
The NPDA runs one debate tournament each year: the NPDA Championship Tournament, held in late March or early April at rotating host sites. While the inaugural tournament in 1994 only hosted around 40 teams, the 2004 Championship Tournament had over 300 in the field from over a half-dozen nations. The tournament's practices are generally modeled by smaller invitational tournaments, which provide the bulk of year-long competition. NPDA sanctions many of these tournaments, and the school that does the best at sanctioned invitationals over the course of the year is awarded a year-long sweepstakes championship.

Relationship to other tournaments and organizations
There are usually several NPDA-sanctioned invitational tournaments in the US to choose from on almost every weekend of the academic year. The largest of these tournaments include the Mile High Swing held in Januaryd co-hosted in recent years by Texas Tech University and the University of Utah in Salt Lake City, Utah, the season-opening Bowman Debates at William Jewell College in September, the Steve Hunt Classic held at Lewis & Clark College in October and the Paul Winters Invitational at the University of the Pacific in November.

Communicating between tournaments
Almost from its inception, the NPDA community has taken advantage of the Internet to continue debates (and to debate about debates) between tournaments and in the off-season. For years, this took place via the official electronic mailing list, much to the chagrin of those who saw that resource as best used for official communication such as posting tournament invitations and results.

Today, much of the online debate (especially between competitors) in the NPDA community takes place via the online forum Net-Benefits.net, founded by University of Southern California then-undergraduate Jed Link. The name "Net-Benefits" is a pun, referring to the debate paradigm by which the debate judge weighs the net benefits of two competing policies. The site is now an electronic hub for discourse and information on parliamentary debate.

NPDA National Champions
Every year since 1994, the organization has held a national championship tournament. Winning teams include:

Top speakers

Commonly used books
The Parli Prepbook compiled by Kyle Dennis and written by several coaches and renowned competitors, a community-driven guide to modern parliamentary debate.
Strategic Argumentation in Parliamentary Debate by Eric Robertson, good for beginners and intermediate
Art, Argument, and Advocacy: Mastering Parliamentary Debate by John Meany and Kate Shuster, bst for intermediate and advanced
On that point:  Introduction to Parliamentary Debate by John Meany, good for beginners
Burden of Proof: An introductory guide to argumentation and guide to parliamentary debate by Mark Crossman, good for beginners
Competitive Debate: The Official Guide by Richard E Edwards, good for high schools and not just parli

See also 
 Competitive debate in the United States

References

External links
National Parliamentary Debate Association - homepage of the organization
National Parliamentary Tournament of Excellence - view current and old NPTE rankings
Net-Benefits.net - online community for college parliamentary debate
ForensicsTournament.net - online registration site for NPDA Nationals.

Student debating societies